Francis George Morley (16 June 1873 – 18 May 1955) was a British colonial administrator who served as the 26th Colonial Auditor of Sri Lanka (then known as Ceylon).  He was appointed on 1 March 1922, succeeding Wilfrid Wentworth Woods, and held the office until 25 June 1931.  He was succeeded by Oliver Ernest Goonetilleke.

References

Auditors General of Sri Lanka
1873 births
1955 deaths
People from West Ham
British people in British Ceylon